Icticephalus is an extinct genus of therocephalian therapsids from the Middle and Late Permian of South Africa. The type species Icticephalus polycynodon was named from the Tapinocephalus Assemblage Zone by South African paleontologist Robert Broom in 1915. Specimens of Icticephalus have also been described from the Cistecephalus Assemblage Zone. Broom originally placed Icticephalus in the Scaloposauridae, a group of very small therocephalians. Most scaloposaurids are now thought to be juvenile forms of other therocephalians, and Scaloposauridae is no longer recognized as a valid grouping. Icticephalus and other former scaloposaurids are now classified as basal members of Baurioidea.

References

Lopingian synapsids of Africa
Guadalupian synapsids of Africa
Baurioids
Therocephalia genera
Guadalupian synapsids
Guadalupian genus first appearances
Capitanian genera
Wuchiapingian genera
Lopingian genus extinctions